Myctophum spinosum, the spiny lanternfish, is a species of lanternfish.

References

External links

Myctophidae
Taxa named by Franz Steindachner
Fish described in 1867